Pelopio (before 1928: Κριεκούκι - Kriekouki) is a settlement in the municipality of Ancient Olympia, Elis, Greece. Pelopio is 3 km east of Smila, 4 km northwest of Olympia and 5 km southwest of Chelidoni. The Greek National Road 74 (Pyrgos - Tripoli) passes south of the village. Pelopio had a population of 976 in 2011.

History

The village was founded in the 15th century during the Ottoman rule. It was founded by Turkish-Albanians who named it originally "Kriekouki" which means "red head" in their language. In 1928 it was renamed to Pelopio after Pelops, the mythical king of Pisa. Pelopio suffered damage from the 2007 Greek forest fires and from a tornado on 3 November 2009.

Population

The population slightly declined over the years due to the economical crises. Most inhabitants who left went to Athens while a few of them immigrated to Germany. It is noted also that others left during the sixties to Patras, Athens or Thessaloniki while a few immigrated to Switzerland, Germany the United States or Canada.

Persons

Vyron Davos, writer, mainly wrote about Elis and its history

External links
 Pelopio GTP Travel Pages

See also

List of settlements in Elis

References

Populated places in Elis